Important structures in plant development are buds, shoots, roots, leaves, and flowers; plants produce these tissues and structures throughout their life from meristems located at the tips of organs, or between mature tissues. Thus, a living plant always has embryonic tissues. By contrast, an animal embryo will very early produce all of the body parts that it will ever have in its life. When the animal is born (or hatches from its egg), it has all its body parts and from that point will only grow larger and more mature. However, both plants and animals pass through a phylotypic stage that evolved independently and that causes a developmental constraint limiting morphological diversification.

According to plant physiologist A. Carl Leopold, the properties of organization seen in a plant are emergent properties which are more than the sum of the individual parts. "The assembly of these tissues and functions into an integrated multicellular organism yields not only the characteristics of the separate parts and processes but also quite a new set of characteristics which would not have been predictable on the basis of examination of the separate parts."

Growth 

A vascular plant begins from a single celled zygote, formed by fertilisation of an egg cell by a sperm cell. From that point, it begins to divide to form a plant embryo through the process of embryogenesis. As this happens, the resulting cells will organize so that one end becomes the first root while the other end forms the tip of the shoot. In seed plants, the embryo will develop one or more "seed leaves" (cotyledons). By the end of embryogenesis, the young plant will have all the parts necessary to begin in its life.

Once the embryo germinates from its seed or parent plant, it begins to produce additional organs (leaves, stems, and roots) through the process of organogenesis. New roots grow from root meristems located at the tip of the root, and new stems and leaves grow from shoot meristems located at the tip of the shoot. Branching occurs when small clumps of cells left behind by the meristem, and which have not yet undergone cellular differentiation to form a specialized tissue, begin to grow as the tip of a new root or shoot. Growth from any such meristem at the tip of a root or shoot is termed primary growth and results in the lengthening of that root or shoot. Secondary growth results in widening of a root or shoot from divisions of cells in a cambium.

In addition to growth by cell division, a plant may grow through cell elongation. This occurs when individual cells or groups of cells grow longer. Not all plant cells grow to the same length. When cells on one side of a stem grow longer and faster than cells on the other side, the stem bends to the side of the slower growing cells as a result. This directional growth can occur via a plant's response to a particular stimulus, such as light (phototropism), gravity (gravitropism), water, (hydrotropism), and physical contact (thigmotropism).

Plant growth and development are mediated by specific plant hormones and plant growth regulators (PGRs) (Ross et al. 1983). Endogenous hormone levels are influenced by plant age, cold hardiness, dormancy, and other metabolic conditions; photoperiod, drought, temperature, and other external environmental conditions; and exogenous sources of PGRs, e.g., externally applied and of rhizospheric origin.

Morphological variation during growth 

Plants exhibit natural variation in their form and structure. While all organisms vary from individual to individual, plants exhibit an additional type of variation. Within a single individual, parts are repeated which may differ in form and structure from other similar parts. This variation is most easily seen in the leaves of a plant, though other organs such as stems and flowers may show similar variation. There are three primary causes of this variation: positional effects, environmental effects, and juvenility.

There is variation among the parts of a mature plant resulting from the relative position where the organ is produced. For example, along a new branch the leaves may vary in a consistent pattern along the branch. The form of leaves produced near the base of the branch differs from leaves produced at the tip of the plant, and this difference is consistent from branch to branch on a given plant and in a given species.

The way in which new structures mature as they are produced may be affected by the point in the plants life when they begin to develop, as well as by the environment to which the structures are exposed. Temperature has a multiplicity of effects on plants depending on a variety of factors, including the size and condition of the plant and the temperature and duration of exposure. The smaller and more succulent the plant, the greater the susceptibility to damage or death from temperatures that are too high or too low. Temperature affects the rate of biochemical and physiological processes, rates generally (within limits) increasing with temperature.

Juvenility or heteroblasty is when the organs and tissues produced by a young plant, such as a seedling, are often different from those that are produced by the same plant when it is older. For example, young trees will produce longer, leaner branches that grow upwards more than the branches they will produce as a fully grown tree. In addition, leaves produced during early growth tend to be larger, thinner, and more irregular than leaves on the adult plant. Specimens of juvenile plants may look so completely different from adult plants of the same species that egg-laying insects do not recognize the plant as food for their young. The transition from early to late growth forms is sometimes called vegetative phase change.

Adventitious structures

Plant structures, including, roots, buds, and shoots, that develop in unusual locations are called adventitious. Such structures are common in vascular plants.

Adventitious roots and buds usually develop near the existing vascular tissues so that they can connect to the xylem and phloem. However, the exact location varies greatly. In young stems, adventitious roots often form from parenchyma between the vascular bundles. In stems with secondary growth, adventitious roots often originate in phloem parenchyma near the vascular cambium. In stem cuttings, adventitious roots sometimes also originate in the callus cells that form at the cut surface. Leaf cuttings of the Crassula form adventitious roots in the epidermis.

Buds and shoots

Adventitious buds develop from places other than a shoot apical meristem, which occurs at the tip of a stem, or on a shoot node, at the leaf axil, the bud being left there during primary growth. They may develop on roots or leaves, or on shoots as a new growth. Shoot apical meristems produce one or more axillary or lateral buds at each node. When stems produce considerable secondary growth, the axillary buds may be destroyed. Adventitious buds may then develop on stems with secondary growth.

Adventitious buds are often formed after the stem is wounded or pruned. The adventitious buds help to replace lost branches. Adventitious buds and shoots also may develop on mature tree trunks when a shaded trunk is exposed to bright sunlight because surrounding trees are cut down. Redwood (Sequoia sempervirens) trees often develop many adventitious buds on their lower trunks. If the main trunk dies, a new one often sprouts from one of the adventitious buds. Small pieces of redwood trunk are sold as souvenirs termed redwood burls. They are placed in a pan of water, and the adventitious buds sprout to form shoots.

Some plants normally develop adventitious buds on their roots, which can extend quite a distance from the plant. Shoots that develop from adventitious buds on roots are termed suckers. They are a type of natural vegetative reproduction in many species, e.g. many grasses, quaking aspen and Canada thistle. The Pando quaking aspen grew from one trunk to 47,000 trunks via adventitious bud formation on a single root system.

Some leaves develop adventitious buds, which then form adventitious roots, as part of vegetative reproduction; e.g. piggyback plant (Tolmiea menziesii) and mother-of-thousands (Kalanchoe daigremontiana). The adventitious plantlets then drop off the parent plant and develop as separate clones of the parent.

Coppicing is the practice of cutting tree stems to the ground to promote rapid growth of adventitious shoots. It is traditionally used to produce poles, fence material or firewood. It is also practiced for biomass crops grown for fuel, such as poplar or willow.

Roots

Adventitious rooting may be a stress-avoidance acclimation for some species, driven by such inputs as hypoxia or nutrient deficiency. Another ecologically important function of adventitious rooting is the vegetative reproduction of tree species such as Salix and Sequoia in riparian settings.

The ability of plant stems to form adventitious roots is utilised in commercial propagation by cuttings. Understanding of the physiological mechanisms behind adventitious rooting has allowed some progress to be made in improving the rooting of cuttings by the application of synthetic auxins as rooting powders and by the use of selective basal wounding. Further progress can be made in future years by applying research into other regulatory mechanisms to commercial propagation and by the comparative analysis of molecular and ecophysiological control of adventitious rooting in 'hard to root' vs. 'easy to root' species.

Adventitious roots and buds are very important when people propagate plants via cuttings, layering, tissue culture. Plant hormones, termed auxins, are often applied to stem, shoot or leaf cuttings to promote adventitious root formation, e.g., African violet and sedum leaves and shoots of poinsettia and coleus. Propagation via root cuttings requires adventitious bud formation, e.g., in horseradish and apple. In layering, adventitious roots are formed on aerial stems before the stem section is removed to make a new plant. Large houseplants are often propagated by air layering. Adventitious roots and buds must develop in tissue culture propagation of plants.

Modified forms

Tuberous roots lack a definite shape; example: sweet potato.
Fasciculated root (tuberous root) occur in clusters at the base of the stem; examples: asparagus, dahlia.
Nodulose roots become swollen near the tips; example: turmeric.
Stilt roots arise from the first few nodes of the stem. These penetrate obliquely down into the soil and give support to the plant; examples: maize, sugarcane.
Prop roots give mechanical support to aerial branches. The lateral branches grow vertically downward into the soil and act as pillars; example: banyan.
Climbing roots arising from nodes attach themselves to some support and climb over it; example: Epipremnum aureum.
Moniliform or beaded roots the fleshy roots give a beaded appearance, e.g.: bitter gourd, Portulaca.

Leaf development
The genetics behind leaf shape development in Arabidopsis thaliana has been broken down into three stages: The initiation of the leaf primordium, the establishment of dorsiventrality, and the development of a marginal meristem. Leaf primordium is initiated by the suppression of the genes and proteins of the class I KNOX family (such as SHOOT APICAL MERISTEMLESS). These class I KNOX proteins directly suppress gibberellin biosynthesis in the leaf primodium. Many genetic factors were found to be involved in the suppression of these genes in leaf primordia (such as ASYMMETRIC LEAVES1, BLADE-ON-PETIOLE1, SAWTOOTH1, etc.). Thus, with this suppression, the levels of gibberellin increase and leaf primorium initiates growth.

Flower development

Flower development is the process by which angiosperms produce a pattern of gene expression in meristems that leads to the appearance of an organ oriented towards sexual reproduction, the flower. There are three physiological developments that must occur in order for this to take place: firstly, the plant must pass from sexual immaturity into a sexually mature state (i.e. a transition towards flowering); secondly, the transformation of the apical meristem’s function from a vegetative meristem into a floral meristem or inflorescence; and finally the growth of the flower’s individual organs. The latter phase has been modelled using the ABC model, which describes the biological basis of the process from the perspective of molecular and developmental genetics.

An external stimulus is required in order to trigger the differentiation of the meristem into a flower meristem. This stimulus will activate mitotic cell division in the meristem, particularly on its sides where new primordia are formed. This same stimulus will also cause the meristem to follow a developmental pattern that will lead to the growth of floral meristems as opposed to vegetative meristems. The main difference between these two types of meristem, apart from the obvious disparity between the objective organ, is the verticillate (or whorled) phyllotaxis, that is, the absence of stem elongation among the successive whorls or verticils of the primordium. These verticils follow an acropetal development, giving rise to sepals, petals, stamens and carpels. Another difference from vegetative axillary meristems is that the floral meristem is «determined», which means that, once differentiated, its cells will no longer divide.

The identity of the organs present in the four floral verticils is a consequence of the interaction of at least three types of gene products, each with distinct functions. According to the ABC model, functions A and C are required in order to determine the identity of the verticils of the perianth and the reproductive verticils, respectively. These functions are exclusive and the absence of one of them means that the other will determine the identity of all the floral verticils. The B function allows the differentiation of petals from sepals in the secondary verticil, as well as the differentiation of the stamen from the carpel on the tertiary verticil.

Floral fragrance
Plants use floral form, flower, and scent to attract different insects for pollination. Certain compounds within the emitted scent appeal to particular pollinators. In Petunia hybrida, volatile benzenoids are produced to give off the floral smell. While components of the benzenoid biosynthetic pathway are known, the enzymes within the pathway, and subsequent regulation of those enzymes, are yet to be discovered.

To determine pathway regulation, P. hybrida Mitchell flowers were used in a petal-specific microarray to compare the flowers that were just about to produce the scent, to the P. hybrida cultivar W138 flowers that produce few volatile benzenoids. cDNAs of genes of both plants were sequenced. The results demonstrated that there is a transcription factor upregulated in the Mitchell flowers, but not in the W138 flowers lacking the floral aroma. This gene was named ODORANT1 (ODO1). To determine expression of ODO1 throughout the day, RNA gel blot analysis was done. The gel showed that ODO1 transcript levels began increasing between 1300 and 1600 h, peaked at 2200 h and were lowest at 1000 h. These ODO1 transcript levels directly correspond to the timeline of volatile benzenoid emission. Additionally, the gel supported the previous finding that W138 non-fragrant flowers have only one-tenth the ODO1 transcript levels of the Mitchell flowers. Thus, the amount of ODO1 made corresponds to the amount of volatile benzenoid emitted, indicating that ODO1 regulates benzenoid biosynthesis.

Additional genes contributing to the biosynthesis of major scent compounds are OOMT1 and OOMT2. OOMT1 and OOMT2 help to synthesize orcinol O-methyltransferases (OOMT), which catalyze the last two steps of the DMT pathway, creating 3,5-dimethoxytoluene (DMT). DMT is a scent compound produced by many different roses yet, some rose varieties, like Rosa gallica and Damask rose Rosa damascene, do not emit DMT. It has been suggested that these varieties do not make DMT because they do not have the OOMT genes. However, following an immunolocalization experiment, OOMT was found in the petal epidermis. To study this further, rose petals were subjected to ultracentrifugation. Supernatants and pellets were inspected by western blot. Detection of OOMT protein at 150,000g in the supernatant and the pellet allowed for researchers to conclude that OOMT protein is tightly associated with petal epidermis membranes. Such experiments determined that OOMT genes do exist within Rosa gallica and Damask rose Rosa damascene varieties, but the OOMT genes are not expressed in the flower tissues where DMT is made.

References

 
Development